Flintstone is a small rural residential locality in the local government area of Central Highlands in the Central region of Tasmania. The 2016 census determined a population of 4 for the state suburb of Flintstone.

History
Flintstone is a confirmed suburb/locality. It was so named by locals because of sharp stones in the area.

Geography
Flintstone is fully enclosed by the locality of Arthurs Lake. The north-eastern boundary is the shore of the lake (Arthurs Lake).

Road infrastructure
The C525 route (Arthurs Lake Road) skirts the south-western boundary of Flintstone.

References

Localities of Central Highlands Council
Towns in Tasmania